Divided is a British game show that aired on ITV from 18 May 2009 to 7 May 2010. It was hosted by Andrew Castle with Charlotte Hudson as the Question Master for Series 1 and Rachel Pierman as the Question Master for Series 2.

Format
A team of three complete strangers attempt to answer up to 15 questions over the course of five rounds and accumulate as much money in a prize pot as possible. In the first four rounds, each question is either multiple-choice with one correct answer to be chosen from three options, or a list of three items to be placed in a specified order. The fifth round has a single question with three answer options, more than one of which may be correct, and the team must select all correct answers in order to win the money.

The team has 100 seconds to arrive at a unanimous decision on each question, and the money at stake decreases continuously at a rate of 1% per second that elapses before they lock in their choice. A correct answer adds the remaining money to a prize pot, while an incorrect answer cuts the pot in half. If the team misses a total of three questions, the game ends immediately and the team forfeits all winnings.

The payout structure for each round is shown below.

At the end of each round, the team is given 15 seconds to decide whether to continue the game, or stop playing and divide up the money. If they elect to continue or fail to reach a unanimous decision before time runs out, the next round begins automatically.

When the team either completes the fifth round or chooses to stop playing, the money in the prize pot is divided into three unequal shares, typically 50-70%, 20-40%, and 10%. Each player is given 15 seconds to state their case to the others as to which share they feel they deserve, after which all three select the share they want. If each player selects a different share, they each receive their chosen amount and the game ends. If not, they are given a further 100 seconds to discuss the splits among themselves and try to reach a consensus, with all three shares decreasing by 1% per second. The timer pauses briefly after 50 seconds, and the host reminds them that half their money has gone. If the team agrees on a split before time runs out, they receive whatever is left of their chosen shares; otherwise, the team leaves with nothing.

Academic paper
The show has been studied by a team of economists. They find that individual behaviour and outcomes are strongly influenced by equity concerns: those who contributed more to the jackpot claiming larger shares are less likely to make concessions and take home larger amounts. Contestants who announce that they will not back down do well relative to others, but they do not secure larger absolute amounts and they harm others. They find no evidence of a first-mover advantage and little evidence that demographic characteristics matter.

Transmissions

International versions

Notes

External links

 Article about the arabian version (In Arabic)

2009 British television series debuts
2010 British television series endings
2000s British game shows
2010s British game shows
English-language television shows
ITV game shows
Television series by ITV Studios
Television series by Banijay
Television shows set in Manchester